The O'Rorkes were the historic rulers of Breifne.

O'Rorke may refer to several different people:

People
Patrick O'Rorke (1837–1863), Irish-American colonel in the Union Army during the American Civil War
Sir Maurice O'Rorke (1830–1916), New Zealand Speaker of the House 1879–1902
Rt Rev Mowbray O'Rorke DD (1869-1953), Bishop of Accra 1911-24
Barry O'Rorke (born 1989), Irish Gaelic football and hurling player
Brian OʼRorke (1901–1974), New Zealand interior designer

Institutions

O'Rorke Hall, a residential hall at the University of Auckland named after Sir Maurice O'Rorke

See also
 O'Rourke
Rorke

Surnames